Very-long-chain 3-oxoacyl-CoA reductase (very-long-chain 3-ketoacyl-CoA reductase, very-long-chain beta-ketoacyl-CoA reductase, KCR (gene), IFA38 (gene)) is an enzyme with systematic name (3R)-3-hydroxyacyl-CoA:NADP+ oxidoreductase. This enzyme catalyses the following chemical reaction

 a very-long-chain (3R)-3-hydroxyacyl-CoA + NADP+  a very-long-chain 3-oxoacyl-CoA + NADPH + H+

This microsomal complex extends palmitoyl-CoA and stearoyl-CoA (and their modified forms) to very-long-chain acyl CoAs.

References

External links 
 

EC 1.1.1